Baseball's Greatest Hits is the name of two different CD collections of songs and other recordings connected with baseball, released in 1989.

The eclectic collections include vintage songs such as Les Brown's "Joltin' Joe DiMaggio" from 1941, Teresa Brewer's 1956 number "I Love Mickey" (with a cameo by Mickey Mantle himself), and Danny Kaye's humorous 1962 recording about the Los Angeles Dodgers. Spoken entries include verbiage such as Russ Hodges' call of Bobby Thomson's pennant-winning home run in 1951, Tommy Lasorda's rant about Dave Kingman, and the Abbott and Costello classic, "Who's on First?".

However, due to licensing restrictions. Rhino was unable to include "Centerfield" by John Fogerty.

Baseball's Greatest Hits (1990)

 Take Me Out to the Ball Game (Excerpt) – Doc & Merle Watson
 Who's on First? – Abbott and Costello
 Joltin' Joe DiMaggio – Les Brown and His Orchestra with Betty Bonney and Joe DiMaggio
 Say Hey (The Willie Mays Song) – The Treniers with Willie Mays
 I Love Mickey – Teresa Brewer with Mickey Mantle
 Van Lingle Mungo – Dave Frishberg  
 D-O-D-G-E-R-S Song (Oh, Really? No, O'Malley) – Danny Kaye
 Did You See Jackie Robinson Hit That Ball? – Count Basie & His Orchestra
 Lou Gehrig's Farewell Speech July 4, 1939 – Lou Gehrig 
 Move Over, Babe (Here Comes Henry) – Bill Slayback
 Take Me Out to the Ball Game – Bruce Springstone (a Bruce Springsteen imitator)
 (Love Is Like a) Baseball Game – The Intruders
 Willie, Mickey and the Duke (Talkin' Baseball) – Terry Cashman
 The Land of Wrigley – Stormy Weather
 A Dying Cub Fan's Last Request – Steve Goodman
 The Ball Game – Sister Wynona Carr
 Baseball Dreams – The Naturals 
 Baseball Card Lover – Rockin' Ritchie Ray 
 Tommy Lasorda Talking About Dave Kingman's May 14, 1978, game – Tommy Lasorda
 We Are the Champions – Big Blue Wrecking Crew 
 Bobby Thomson's Shot Heard 'Round the World – Russ Hodges   
 Casey at the Bat – DeWolf Hopper

Baseball's Greatest Hits – Let's Play II (1992)

 Intro: Baseball Hall Of Fame Induction, Aug. 8, 1977 – Bowie Kuhn and Ernie Banks
 It's A Beautiful Day For A Ball Game – The Harry Simeone Songsters
 The First Baseball Game – Nat King Cole With Orchestra Conducted by Ralph Carmichael  
 Robbie-Doby-Boogie – Brownie McGhee
 Let's Keep The Dodgers In Brooklyn – Phil Foster with music by Rey Ross
 Bogey On Baseball circa 1950 – Humphrey Bogart
 Baseball, Baseball – Jane Morgan with George Barnes Quintet
 The St. Louis Browns – Skip Battin   
 You've Gotta Have Heart – from Damn Yankees
 Casey and The Mick – Casey Stengel, Mickey Mantle, and U.S. Senator Estes Kefauver
 Right Field – Peter, Paul and Mary   
 Knock It Out Of The Park – Sam and Dave with The Dixie Flyers   
 Play-By-Play (I Saw It On The Radio) – Terry Cashman   
 Hammerin' Hank's Historic Homer – Milo Hamilton   
 That Last Home Run – McKinley Mitchell   
 Baseball Blues – Claire Hamill   
 Will You Be Ready (At The Plate When Jesus Throws the Ball)? – Elmo and Patsy   
 What Sparks A Champion? – Various Artists   
 The Philadelphia Phillies – Del Reeves   
 The Bingo Long Song (Steal On Home) – Thelma Houston   
 The Cubbies Are Rockin' – M.C. Gary/D.J. Barry & The Aggregation   
 The Game For All America (A Definition of Baseball) – Ernie Harwell   
 Na Na Hey Hey (Kiss Him Goodbye) – The C. Norman Ensemble of The First Baptist Church of Crown Heights

References

Baseball mass media